Procleobis is a monotypic genus of ammotrechid camel spiders, first described by Karl Kraepelin in 1899. Its single species, Procleobis patagonicus is distributed in Argentina.

References 

Solifugae
Arachnid genera
Monotypic arachnid genera